Estadio La Ceiba is a multi-use stadium in the San Felix area of Ciudad Guayana, Venezuela.  It is currently used mostly for baseball games.  The stadium holds 30,000 people.

External links
Picture of stadium

La Ceiba
Buildings and structures in Bolívar (state)
Buildings and structures in Ciudad Guayana